Gilla Ceallaigh Ua Cleirigh (died 1003) was King of Ui Fiachrach Aidhne.

Gilla Ceallaigh was the next-to-last of the Ua Cleirigh kings of Aidhne. From this time on, the family lost power and eventually became an ecclesiastical family. Members included:

 Conchobhar Ua Cleirigh, lector of Kildare, died 1126
 Gilla Isa Ó Cléirigh, Bishop of Leyny (Achonry), died 1230

His descendants would eventually become the Ó Cléirigh Bardic family.

References
 http://www.clarelibrary.ie/eolas/coclare/genealogy/hynes_family.htm
 Irish Kings and High-Kings, Francis John Byrne (2001), Dublin: Four Courts Press, 
 CELT: Corpus of Electronic Texts at University College Cork

People from County Galway
11th-century Irish monarchs
1003 deaths
Gaels